McCrum is a surname. Notable people with the surname include:

Charles McCrum (born 1964), Irish cricketer
Michael McCrum (1924–2005), English academic and historian
Paul McCrum (born 1962), Irish cricketer
Robert McCrum (born 1953), English writer and editor
William McCrum (1865–1932), Irish linen manufacturer and footballer
John Conal McCrum (born 1952), English doctor and school governor 
Mark McCrum (born 1958), English Author